The following is an episode list for the Disney Channel Original Series, Brandy & Mr. Whiskers.

Series overview

Episodes

Season 1 (2004–2005)
Note: All episodes in this season were directed by Timothy Björklund.

Season 2 (2006)

External links
 

Lists of Disney Channel television series episodes
Lists of American children's animated television series episodes